Mehmed (modern Turkish: Mehmet) is the most common Bosnian and Turkish form of the Arabic name Muhammad (Muhammed and Muhammet are also used, though considerably less) and gains its significance from being the name of Muhammad, the prophet of Islam. Originally the intermediary vowels in the Arabic Muhammad were completed with an e in adaptation to Turkish phonotactics, which spelled Mehemmed, Mehemed, Mehmed and the name lost the central e over time Final devoicing of d to t is a regular process in Turkish. The prophet himself is referred to in Turkish using the archaic version, Muhammed.

The name Mehmet also often appears in derived compound names. The name is also prevalent in former Ottoman territories, particularly among Balkan Muslims in Albania, Bosnia and Kosovo. The name is also commonly used in Turkish culture in the form of Mehmetçik, meaning little Mehmet, for unranked soldiers.

Given name

Mehmed
Mehmed I (1382–1421), Ottoman sultan
Mehmed II (1432–1481), Ottoman sultan (Fatih, "the Conqueror")
Mehmed III (1566–1603), Ottoman sultan
Mehmed IV (1642–1693), Ottoman sultan (Avcı, "the Hunter")
Mehmed V (1844–1918), Ottoman sultan
Mehmed VI (1861–1926), 36th and last Ottoman sultan
Mehmed I Giray (1465–1523), a khan of the Crimean Khanate in 1515–1523
Mehmed Abdulaziz (1901–1977), Ottoman prince
Mehmed Alagić (1947–2003), Bosnian soldier
Mehmed Alajbegović (1906–1947), Croatian politician
Mehmed Ali Pasha (disambiguation)
Mehmed Alispahić (born 1987), Bosnian footballer
Mehmed Baždarević (born 1960), Bosnian football manager
Mehmed Bushati, Albanian Pasha
Mehmed Emin (disambiguation)
Mehmed Emin Pasha (disambiguation)
Mehmed Ertuğrul Efendi (1912–1944), Ottoman prince
Mehmed Handžić (1906–1944), Bosnian author
Mehmed Janjoš (born 1957), Bosnian football manager
Mehmed Kalakula, Albanian politician
Mehmed Kodro (born 1967), Bosnian footballer and football manager
Mehmed Malkoč (born 1990), Bosnian footballer
Mehmed Merejan, Bulgarian poet
Mehmed Orhan (1909–1994), Ottoman prince
Mehmed Pasha (disambiguation)
Mehmed Namık Pasha (1804–1892), Ottoman statesman
Mehmed Reshid (1873–1919), Ottoman governor of the Diyarbekir Vilayet
Mehmed Sadık Pasha (1825–1901), Ottoman statesman
Mehmed Said Efendi (died 1761), Ottoman statesman
Mehmed Selim Pasha (1771–1831), Ottoman statesman
Mehmed Spaho (1883–1939), Bosnian politician
Mehmed Talat, Ottoman Grand Vizier
Mehmed Uzun (1953–2007), Kurdish writer
Kavalalı Mehmed Ali Pasha (1769–1849), Ottoman Albanian viceroy of Egypt
Kadızade Mehmed (1582–1635), Islamic preacher in the Ottoman Empire.
Mehmet Ali Ağca, Turkish gunman

Mehmet
Mehmet Akgün (born 1986), Turkish-German footballer
Mehmet Al (born 1983), Turkish footballer
Mehmet Altan (born 1953), Turkish economist, columnist, and writer
Mehmet Altınsoy (1924–2007), Turkish politician
Mehmet Arif (disambiguation)
Mehmet Aslantuğ (born 1961), Turkish actor
Mehmet Aydın (born 1943), Turkish politician
Mehmet Aziz (malariologist), Cypriot malariologist
Mehmet Aurélio (born 1977), Brazilian-born Turkish footballer
Mehmet Batdal (born 1986), Turkish footballer
Mehmet Baydar (1924–1973), Turkish assassinated diplomat
Mehmet Boztepe (born 1988), Turkish-German footballer
Mehmet Bölükbaşı (born 1978), Turkish footballer
Mehmet Budak (born 1980), Turkish footballer
Mehmet Cavit Bey (1875–1926), Turkish economist
Mehmet Cesur (born 1982), Turkish Paralympian goalball player
Mehmet Çetingöz (born 1991), Turkish wheelchair basketball player
Mehmet Eren Boyraz (born 1981), Turkish footballer
Mehmet Emin (disambiguation)
Mehmet Emin Toprak (1974–2002), Turkish actor
Mehmet Esat Bülkat (1862–1952), Ottoman general
Mehmet Çakır (born 1984), Turkish footballer
Mehmet Cansun (born 1947), Turkish businessman
Mehmet Çekiç (born 1970), Turkish-French Paralympic alpine skier
Mehmet Cemaleddin Efendi (1848–1917), Turkish judge
Mehmet Çoban (1905–1969), Turkish wrestler
Mehmet Çoğum (born 1983), Turkish footballer
Mehmet Coral (born 1947), Turkish novelist
Mehmet Culum (born 1948), Turkish novelist
Mehmet Dinçer (born 1924), Turkish former footballer
Mehmet Dragusha (born 1977), Albanian footballer
Mehmet Durakovic (born 1965), Australian footballer
Mehmet Ebussuud el-İmadi, Ottoman jurist
Mehmet Ekici (born 1990), German footballer
Mehmet Ergen, Turkish theatre director
Mehmet Eroğlu (born 1948), Turkish novelist
Mehmet Eymür (born 1965), Turkish intelligence official
Mehmet Ferda (born 1963), British actor
Mehmet Fuat Köprülü (1890–1966), Turkish politician
Mehmet Güney (born 1936), Turkish judge
Mehmet Günsür (born 1975), Turkish actor
Mehmet Güreli (born 1949), Turkish writer
Mehmet Gürs (born 1969), Turkish chef
Mehmet Güven (born 1987), Turkish footballer
Mehmet Hacıoğlu (born 1959), Turkish former football coach
Mehmet Haberal (born 1944), Turkish surgeon
Mehmet Hakkı Suçin, Turkish author
Mehmet Hetemaj (born 1987), Finnish footballer
Mehmet Vehib Kaçı, Ottoman general
Mehmet Kaplan (born 1971), Swedish politician
Mehmet Kara (born 1983), Turkish footballer
Mehmet Keçeci (born 1972), Turkish Physicist
Mehmet Sarper Kiskaç (born 1990), Turkish footballer
Mehmet Konica, Albanian politician
Mehmet Kurtuluş (born 1972), German actor
Mehmet Kutay Şenyıl (born 1987), Turkish footballer
Mehmet Leblebi (1908–1972), Turkish footballer
Mehmet Mehdi Eker, Turkish politician
Mehmet Müezzinoğlu (born 1955), Turkish physician, politician, and Minister of Health
Mehmet Murat Somer (born 1959), Turkish author
Mehmet Nas (born 1979), Turkish footballer
Mehmet Niyazi (1878–1931), Romanian and Crimean Tatar poet
Mehmet Okonsar (born 1961), Turkish-Belgian pianist
Mehmet Okur (born 1979), Turkish basketball player
Mehmet Oktav (1917–1996), Turkish wrestler
Mehmet Osman, a fictional character from the BBC soap opera EastEnders
Mehmet Oz (born 1960), Turkish-American physician and television presenter
Mehmet Özal (born 1978), Turkish wrestler
Mehmet Özdilek (born 1966), Turkish footballer
Mehmet Özhaseki (born 1957), Turkish politician
Mehmet Ozyurek (born 1949), Turkish world record holder
Mehmet Polat (born 1978), Turkish footballer
Mehmet Sabancı (1963–2004), Turkish businessman
Mehmet Sak (born 1990), Turkish footballer
Mehmet Scholl (born 1970), Turkish-German footballer
Mehmet Sedef (born 1987), Turkish footballer
Mehmet Şimşek (born 1967), Turkish politician
Mehmet Şenol Şişli, Turkish musician
Mehmet Shehu (1913–1981), Albanian politician
Mehmet Tahsini (1864–?), Albanian politician
Mehmet Tanrısever (born 1953), Turkish film producer
Mehmet Tarhan (born 1978), Turkish activist
Mehmet Terzi (born 1955), Turkish long-distance runner
Mehmet Tillem (1974–2019), Australian politician
Mehmet Toner (born 1958), Turkish biomedical engineer
Mehmet Topal (born 1986), Turkish footballer

Mehmet Topuz (born 1983), Turkish footballer
Mehmet Türkmehmet (born 1980), Turkish footballer
Mehmet Nadir Ünal (born 1993), Turkish kickboxer and amateur boxer
Mehmet Vasıf Yakut, Turkish Para Taekwondo practitioner
Mehmet Yağmur (born 1987), Turkish basketball player
Mehmet Yıldız (born 1981), Turkish footballer
Mehmet Yılmaz (disambiguation)
 Mehmet Yılmaz (footballer born 1988), Turkish footballer
 Mehmet Yılmaz (footballer born 1979), Turkish footballer
Mehmet Yozgatlı (born 1979), Turkish footballer
Mehmet Zafer Çağlayan (born 1957), Turkish politician
Mehmet Duraković (born 1965), Bosnian-Australian football manager

Derived names
Mehmet Akif
Mehmet Ali
Mehmet Emin
Mehmethan (Mehmet + Han)
Mehmetcan (Mehmet +  Can)

Surname
Alp Mehmet (born 1948), British diplomat
Billy Mehmet (born 1984), English-Irish footballer of Turkish descent
Dave Mehmet (born 1960), English former footballer
Naz Mehmet, a fictional character from EastEnders: E20
Madina Memet, Chinese actress of Uyghur descent

See also
Mehmetçik
Mehmed Pasha (disambiguation)
Mehmet of Karaman (disambiguation)
Atçalı Kel Mehmet (1780–1830), a Zeybek who led a local revolt against Ottoman authority

Turkish-language surnames
Turkish masculine given names
Bosniak masculine given names